Victor Ahlström, born  in Farsta, Stockholm, is a Swedish professional ice hockey player (left wing), who is currently playing for Frisk Asker of the Norwegian GET-ligaen.

Ahlström has played five seasons with Huddinge IK in HockeyAllsvenskan, before making his debut in the Swedish Hockey League with AIK IF. He has a twin brother, Oscar, who also plays in Frisk Asker.

Career statistics

References

External links
 

Living people
1986 births
AIK IF players
Frisk Asker Ishockey players
Huddinge IK players
Södertälje SK players
IF Sundsvall Hockey players
Swedish ice hockey left wingers
Swedish twins
Twin sportspeople